The Mudry CAP 10 is a two-seat training aerobatic aircraft first built in 1970 and still in production in 2007.
The plane was developed from the Piel Super Emeraude and was born as the CP100. The name changed to CAP 10, CAP for 'Constructions Aéronautiques Parisiennes'. The CAP 10 was manufactured by Mudry (name of its designer) in Bernay, France, bought by CAP Industries which then became Apex Aircraft. Following the bankruptcy of Apex in 2008, rights to produce spares were awarded to Dyn'Aviation. After the bankruptcy of DynAero in 2012, manufacture of spares was taken over by CEAPR in Darois.

Design and development
The prototype C.P. 100 was first flown in August 1968 and was followed by the production variants, the CAP 10 and CAP 10B which had revised tail surfaces. The CAP 10 is a low-wing cantilever monoplane of wooden construction, with the CAP 10C having a carbon sandwich wing spar.

The engine is a  Lycoming AEIO-360 fuel injection engine, fully lubricated in inverted flight.

300+ aircraft were built between 1970 and 2007 and an updated version of the CAP 10C is produced by Robin Aircraft as the CAP 10C NG since 2021.

The CAP 10 is one of the most successful aerobatic training aircraft in the world. About 200 aircraft are still flying in the late 2000s and nearly two generations of aerobatic champions made their classes with it.

In the late 70's the CAP 10 was developed to the single seater family of the CAP 20, 20L and 21. In the 1980s, a far derivative was the most successful family of the Cap 23x competition single seaters.

Variants

C.A.A.R.P. C.P.100 Two prototype aircraft developed from the Piel Emeraude
CAP 10 Initial production aircraft. One built, which was fundamentally the third prototype.
CAP 10B Later production aircraft with ventral fin and enlarged rudder
CAP 10C Improved structure with carbon-fibre wing spar.
CAP 10C NG Updated version of the CAP 10C in production since 2021.
CAP 10R (R for Remorqueur-Tow Plane- ) Prototype of a glider tug version
CAP 10S The French Navy ordered six copies of a special version, the CAP-10S, which entered service in 1980 with the SIV (Flight Initiation Section) in Fréjus-Saint-Raphaël, then equipped the 51S squadron in Rochefort-Sur-Mer. Today, they equip the EIP 50S at Lanvéoc-Poulmic and are used to assess and select naval aviation students.
CAP 10B/K The exact same model as the CAP 10B modified through the implementation of a modification of the main wing spar approved under "MAJOR REPAIR DESIGN APPROVAL 10045153" by the EASA. This modification has been developed by the French Company Air-Menuiserie in 2013 and allows the CAP 10B/K to recover its flight envelope limitations (Maximum G-Force: +6.5G -4.5G).

Operators

Military
 
French Air Force
French Navy 
 Used to equip Equipe Voltige aerobatic display team.
 The Mexican Air Force bought 20 

 3 operated by BAE Training Systems in Tamworth as part of the flight screening process on behalf of the Royal Australian Air Force, Royal Australian Navy and the Australian Army.

Civilian
More than 200 were built, mostly for aero-clubs all around the world. A huge number of European champions have started aerobatics on a Cap 10.

Specifications (CAP 10B)

See also

Footnotes

References
 
 

1970s French sport aircraft
Low-wing aircraft
Single-engined tractor aircraft
CAP 010
Aerobatic aircraft
Aircraft first flown in 1968
Conventional landing gear